Stade Raymond Kopa is a football stadium in Angers, France.  It is the home ground of Ligue 1 side Angers SCO and seats 18,752 people. It is named after Raymond Kopa (1931–2017), a French football legend who made his professional debut with the club. It was previously named Stade Bessonneau from 1912 to 1957, Stade Municipal from 1957 to 1968, and Stade Jean-Bouin from 1968 to 2017.

References

External links
Stade Raymond-Kopa

Football venues in France
Multi-purpose stadiums in France
Angers SCO
Sports venues in Maine-et-Loire
Buildings and structures in Angers
Sports venues completed in 1912